Vijayawada, in India, has a well-developed communication and media infrastructure. It has a basic network of optical fiber cables. The city's telephone system is serviced by four landline companies: BSNL, Tata Indicom, Reliance and Airtel. There are a number of mobile-phone companies: Aircel, BSNL, Airtel, Uninor, MTS, Tata Indicom, Tata Docomo and Jio. Several companies offer broadband internet access.

Broadcast radio 
The city has a variety of AM and FM radio stations. AlR Vijayawada, also known as "Aakasavani Vijayawada" is one of the oldest serving FM radio stations in the city. Most of the stations have broadcast 24 hours a day, seven days a week with programming in Telugu and English.

The FM radio stations in the city are:

 AIR Vijayawada Akashvani 103.4 MHz
 AIR Rainbow 102.2 MHz
 Radio City 91.1 MHz
 BIG FM 92.7 92.7 MHz
 Red FM 93.5 MHz
 Ee FM 91.9 MHz
 Radio Mirchi 98.3 MHz

The AM radio stations in the city are:

 AIR Vividh Bharati 1503 kHz
 AIR FM Gold 828 kHz
 AIR FM South Vijayawada (A) 837 kHz

Internet radio 

 Radio Tulip (24/7 Non-Stop Telugu live radio) website Retrieved 2017-04-01.
 Radio Khushi (24/7 Telugu online radio) website Retrieved 2011-09-05.
 TeluguOne Radio (24/7 Telugu live radio  website Retrieved 2011-09-05.
 Tharangamedia website

Television networks 
The Doordarshan Telugu channel, DD Saptagiri, was the first TV channel launched in Hyderabad in the year 1974. After bifurcation of Andhra Pradesh state, DD Saptagiri was relegated to being telecast from Doordarshan Kendra Vijayawada for Andhra Pradesh while the existing network, renamed DD Yadagiri, was aimed at the Telangana populace

Satellite channels 

 DD Saptagiri

Cable channels 

 V Local
 Siti Channel
 C Channel
 MCN

News papers 
Visalaandhra was the first newspaper in the state, started from Vijayawada. As per the 58th annual report of Press India 2013–14, the large and medium Telugu daily publications from Vijayawada include Andhra Jyothy, Eenadu, Sakshi, Suryaa, Andhra Prabha, Vaartha, Prajasakti, and Udaya Bharatam.

Major English publications are Deccan Chronicle, The Hindu, The Times of India, News Boom, The Fourth Voice, The New Indian Express and Views Observer.

Magazines 
Vijayawada has several magazines in Telugu and English languages.

Telugu 

 Neadu
 Swathi
 Navya
 Andhra Prabha
 Andhra Jyotii
 Crime Today
 Vipula
 Chatura
 Vanitha
 Chandamama
 Great Andhra
 Santosham

English 

 Amaravati Times
 B Positive
 India Today

References 

Mass media in Vijayawada
Vijayawada